Ngirhaphium is a genus of flies in the family Dolichopodidae. It is known from mangroves in Singapore and Thailand. The genus is named after Prof. Dr. Peter Ng, from the National University of Singapore, combined with Rhaphium, the name of a related genus.

Species
Ngirhaphium caeruleum Grootaert & Puniamoorthy, 2014
Ngirhaphium chutamasae Samoh, Boonrotpong & Grootaert, 2015
Ngirhaphium meieri Samoh & Grootaert in Samoh, Satasook & Grootaert, 2019
Ngirhaphium murphyi Evenhuis & Grootaert, 2002
Ngirhaphium sivasothii Grootaert & Puniamoorthy, 2014
Ngirhaphium thaicum Samoh & Grootaert in Samoh, Satasook & Grootaert, 2019

References

Rhaphiinae
Dolichopodidae genera
Diptera of Asia